2001 in sports describes the year's events in world sport.

Alpine skiing
 Alpine Skiing World Cup
 Men's overall season champion: Hermann Maier, Austria
 Women's overall season champion: Janica Kostelić, Croatia

American football
 Super Bowl XXXV – the Baltimore Ravens (AFC) won 34–7 over the New York Giants (NFC)
Location: Raymond James Stadium
Attendance: 71,921
MVP: Ray Lewis, LB (Baltimore)
 XFL is founded by WWE Chairman Vince McMahon, but the league folded that same year, after the Los Angeles Xtreme won the league's only championship.
 Orange Bowl (2000 season):
 The Oklahoma Sooners won 13–2 over the Florida State Seminoles in the BCS National Championship Game
 Memorial Stadium, former home of the Baltimore Colts and Baltimore Ravens is demolished
 INVESCO Field at Mile High opens up on September 10, 2001, as the Denver Broncos defeated the New York Giants 31–20. 
 September 30 – New England Patriots quarterback Tom Brady, a 6th round, 199th pick from the 2000 NFL Draft, makes his first professional start after 8-year quarterback Drew Bledsoe suffered a severe injury in a Week 2 game vs. the New York Jets. This would mark a turning point for both the franchise and the NFL, as Brady would lead the Patriots to their first Super Bowl title 5 months later and would lead them to 8 more appearances and 5 more titles in the next 17 years.
 On December 16, 2001, bottlegate occurs

Association football
 Confederations Cup – Held one year before the 2002 FIFA World Cup Korea/Japan, this tournament served as a prelude, for both South Korea & Japan and the participating nations. France defeated Japan to win the tournament.
 Champions' League – Bayern Munich won 5–4 on penalties, in the final against Valencia, after a 1–1 draw at the end of the match. This was Bayern Munich's 4th European Cup title.
 UEFA Cup – Liverpool won 5-4 after extra-time, in the final against Alavés, with an unfortunate own goal/golden goal by Delfi Gelí. This was Liverpool's third UEFA Cup title.
 European Super Cup – Liverpool beat Bayern Munich 3–2, winning the cup for the second time.
 Intercontinental Cup – Bayern Munich beat Boca Juniors 1–0, winning the cup for the second time.
 Asian Champions Cup – Korean side Suwon Samsung Bluewings won their first Asian Champions Cup crown, defeating Júbilo Iwata 1–0. They also lifted the 2001 Asian Super Cup.
 The world record for largest victory in an international football match was set by Australia in a 0–22 victory against Tonga on April 9. Australia set this record again with a 31–0 victory against American Samoa on April 11. The unbalanced nature of these matches prompted changes to the FIFA qualification process.

Athletics
 May – Roman Šebrle breaks a 9.000 points barrier in decathlon event.
 August – 2001 World Championships in Athletics held at Edmonton, Alberta, Canada

Australian rules football
 Australian Football League
 Fremantle equals St. Kilda's 1910 record for the worst start by a team that did not suffer a winless season, beginning with seventeen losses before a huge comeback upset over third-placed Hawthorn.
 The Brisbane Lions win the 105th AFL premiership beating Essendon 15.18 (108) to 12.10 (82).
 Brownlow Medal awarded to Jason Akermanis (Brisbane Lions)

Baseball

 World Series – only 4 seasons old, the Arizona Diamondbacks became the youngest franchise to win a World Series by defeating the New York Yankees 4 games to 3. Series co-MVPs were Randy Johnson and Curt Schilling, both of Arizona.
 The Seattle Mariners tied the 1906 Chicago Cubs’ record with 116 regular season wins.
 Barry Bonds set the record for most home runs in a season with 73.
 Season MVPs – National League: Barry Bonds, San Francisco Giants. American League: Ichiro Suzuki, Seattle Mariners.
 Rookies of the Year – National League:  Albert Pujols, St. Louis Cardinals. American League: Ichiro Suzuki, Seattle.
 Cy Young Award – National League: Randy Johnson, Arizona. American League: Roger Clemens, New York.
 Japan Series – The Yakult Swallows defeat the Osaka Kintetsu Buffaloes 4 games to 1. The Swallows' Atsuya Furuta is named Series MVP.

Basketball
 NBA –
 The Los Angeles Lakers defeat the Philadelphia 76ers, 4 games to 1 in the NBA Finals. The Lakers only loss in the postseason comes in Game 1 of the Finals, which the 76ers win in overtime.
 October 30 – Michael Jordan returns to the National Basketball Association with the Washington Wizards after 3½ years (the Wizards lose 93–91 to the New York Knicks).
 NCAA Men's Basketball Championship –
 Duke wins 82–72 over Arizona
 WNBA Finals –
 Los Angeles Sparks win 2 games to 0 over the Charlotte Sting, earning the franchise's first championship
 Euroleague Final:
 In the first Euroleague to be operated by Euroleague Basketball (company), Kinder Bologna defeats TAU Cerámica 3–2 in the best-of-five series.
 Suproleague Final:
 In the only edition of the rival FIBA-sponsored competition, Maccabi Tel Aviv defeats Panathinaikos 81–67 in the one-off final.
 Chinese Basketball Association finals:
 Bayi Rockets defeat Shanghai Sharks, 3 games to 1
 National Basketball League (Australia) Finals:
 Wollongong Hawks defeated the Townsville Crocodiles 2–1 in the best-of-three final series.
 After a season of conflict between ULEB and FIBA, the two bodies settle their feud, with the Suproleague merging into the Euroleague.

Boxing
 March 3 – John Ruiz defeats Evander Holyfield in their second fight by a decision in 12 rounds, winning the WBA's World Heavyweight Championship, becoming the first Hispanic to win the world Heavyweight title.
 April 22 – Lennox Lewis vs. Hasim Rahman: Hasim Rahman defeats Lennox Lewis in an upset win.
 June 3 to June 10 – World Amateur Boxing Championships held in Belfast, Northern Ireland
 September 29 – in a gala event dedicated to the victims and rescuers of 9/11, Bernard Hopkins defeats Félix Trinidad by a knockout in round 12 to unify the World Middleweight Championship

Canadian football
 November 25 – the Calgary Stampeders win the 89th Grey Cup game, defeating the Winnipeg Blue Bombers 27–19 at Olympic Stadium in Montreal.
 November 29 – the UBC Thunderbirds win the Vanier Cup, defeating the Ottawa Gee-Gees 39–23.

Cricket
 February 25 – death of Sir Donald Bradman, Australian Test cricketer who retains the highest Test match batting average of 99.94
 The Ashes – Australia defeats England 4-1
 V.V.S. Laxman becomes the first Indian to score 250 in a Test match as India fight back from following on to win the Second Test against Australia, ending the Australians' record 16 match winning streak. India goes on to win the series 2–1.
 County Championship (England and Wales) – Yorkshire
 ICC Trophy – Netherlands

Cycle racing
Road bicycle racing
 Giro d'Italia won by Gilberto Simoni of Italy
 Tour de France won by Lance Armstrong of USA (Rescinded)
 UCI Road World Championships – Men's road race – Óscar Freire of Spain
Cyclo-cross
 UCI Cyclo-cross World Championships in Tábor, Czech Republic (February 3–February 4)
 Men's Competition won by Erwin Vervecken
 Women's Competition won by Hanka Kupfernagel

Dogsled racing
 Iditarod Trail Sled Dog Race Champion
 Doug Swingley with lead dogs: Stormy & Pepi

Field hockey
 Men's Champions Trophy: Germany
 Women's Champions Trophy: Argentina

Figure skating
 World Figure Skating Championships –
 Men's champion: Evgeni Plushenko, Russia
 Ladies' champion: Michelle Kwan, United States
 Pairs' champions: Jamie Salé and David Pelletier, Canada
 Ice dance champions: Barbara Fusar-Poli and Maurizio Margaglio

Floorball 
 Women's World Floorball Championships
 Champion: Finland
 Men's under-19 World Floorball Championships
 Champion: Sweden
 European Cup
 Men's champion: Helsingfors IFK
 Women's champion: Balrog IK

Gaelic Athletic Association
 Camogie
 All-Ireland Camogie Champion: Tipperary
 National Camogie League: Cork
 Gaelic football
 All-Ireland Senior Football Championship – Galhiway 0-17 died Meath 0-8
 National Football League – Mayo 0-13 died Galway 0-12
 Ladies' Gaelic football
 All-Ireland Senior Football Champion: Laois
 National Football League: Clare
 Hurling
 All-Ireland Senior Hurling Championship – Tipperary 2-18 died Galway 2-15
 National Hurling League – Tipperary 1–19 beat Clare 0–17

Golf
Men's professional
 Masters Tournament – Tiger Woods  becomes the first golfer in history to hold all four major championship titles at the same time.
 U.S. Open – Retief Goosen
 British Open – David Duval
 PGA Championship – David Toms
 PGA Tour money leader – Tiger Woods – $5,687,777
 PGA Tour Player of the Year – Tiger Woods
 PGA Tour Rookie of the Year – Charles Howell III
 Senior PGA Tour money leader – Allen Doyle – $2,553,582
 Ryder Cup postponed until 2002.
Men's amateur
 British Amateur – Michael Hoey
 U.S. Amateur – Bubba Dickerson
 European Amateur – Stephen Browne
Women's professional
 Nabisco Championship – Annika Sörenstam
 LPGA Championship – Karrie Webb
 U.S. Women's Open – Karrie Webb
 Women's British Open – Se Ri Pak
 LPGA Tour money leader – Annika Sörenstam – $2,105,868

Handball
 2001 World Men's Handball Championship – won by France
 2001 World Women's Handball Championship – won by Russia

Harness racing
 North America Cup – Bettor's Delight
 United States Pacing Triple Crown races –
 Cane Pace – Four Starzz Shark
 Little Brown Jug – Bettor's Delight
 Messenger Stakes – Bagel Beach Boy
 United States Trotting Triple Crown races –
 Hambletonian – Scarlet Knight
 Yonkers Trot – Banker Hall
 Kentucky Futurity – Chaising Tail
 Australian Inter Dominion Harness Racing Championship –
 Pacers: Yulestar
 Trotters: Take A Moment

Horse racing
Steeplechases
 Cheltenham Gold Cup – not held due to the 2001 United Kingdom foot-and-mouth crisis
 Grand National – Red Marauder
Hurdle races
 Champion Hurdle – not held due to the 2001 United Kingdom foot-and-mouth crisis
Flat races
 September 1, 2001: Jockey Tim Moccasin won his 14th consecutive race, a North American record, at Marquis Downs in Saskatoon, Saskatchewan, Canada.
 Australia – Melbourne Cup won by Ethereal
 Canada – Queen's Plate won by Dancethruthedawn
 Dubai – Dubai World Cup won by Captain Steve	
 France – Prix de l'Arc de Triomphe won by Sakhee
 Ireland – Irish Derby Stakes won by Galileo
 Japan – Japan Cup won by Jungle Pocket
 English Triple Crown races:
 2,000 Guineas Stakes – Golan
 The Derby – Galileo
 St. Leger Stakes – Milan
 United States Triple Crown races:
 Kentucky Derby – Monarchos
 Preakness Stakes – Point Given
 Belmont Stakes – Point Given
 Breeders' Cup World Thoroughbred Championships:
 Breeders' Cup Classic – Tiznow
 Breeders' Cup Distaff – Unbridled Elaine
 Breeders' Cup Filly & Mare Turf – Banks Hill
 Breeders' Cup Juvenile – Johannesburg
 Breeders' Cup Juvenile Fillies – Tempera
 Breeders' Cup Mile – Val Royal
 Breeders' Cup Sprint – Squirtle Squirt
 Breeders' Cup Turf – Fantastic Light

Ice hockey
 Art Ross Trophy as the NHL's leading scorer during the regular season: Jaromir Jagr, Pittsburgh Penguins
 Hart Memorial Trophy – for the NHL's Most Valuable Player:
 Joe Sakic – Colorado Avalanche
 Stanley Cup – Ray Bourque of the Colorado Avalanche won his only Stanley Cup when the Colorado Avalanche defeated the New Jersey Devils 4 games to 3.
 World Hockey Championship
 Men's champion: Czech Republic defeated Finland
 Junior Men's champion: Czech Republic defeated Finland
 Women's champion:  Canada defeated the United States

Lacrosse
 Major League Lacrosse begins play as a single-entity-ownership league.
 Long Island Lizards win the first Steinfeld Cup over Baltimore Bayhawks, 15–11.
 The Philadelphia Wings defeat the Toronto Rock 9–8, to win the Champion's Cup.
 The 100th anniversaries of the donations of both the Mann Cup and the Minto Cup.
 The Coquitlam Adanacs win the 100th Mann Cup.
 The St. Catharines Athletics win the 100th Minto Cup.
 The Wallaceburg Red Devils win the Founders Cup.

Mixed martial arts
The following is a list of major noteworthy MMA events during 2001 in chronological order.

|-
|align=center style="border-style: none none solid solid; background: #e3e3e3"|Date
|align=center style="border-style: none none solid solid; background: #e3e3e3"|Event
|align=center style="border-style: none none solid solid; background: #e3e3e3"|Alternate Name/s
|align=center style="border-style: none none solid solid; background: #e3e3e3"|Location
|align=center style="border-style: none none solid solid; background: #e3e3e3"|Attendance
|align=center style="border-style: none none solid solid; background: #e3e3e3"|PPV Buyrate
|align=center style="border-style: none none solid solid; background: #e3e3e3"|Notes
|-align=center
|February 23
|UFC 30: Battle on the Boardwalk
|
| Atlantic City, New Jersey, USA
|
|
|
|-align=center
|March 25
|Pride 13 – Collision Course
|
| Saitama, Japan
|
|
|
|-align=center
|May 4
|UFC 31: Locked and Loaded
|
| Atlantic City, New Jersey, USA
|
|
|
|-align=center
|May 27
|Pride 14 – Clash of the Titans
|
| Yokohama, Japan
|
|
|
|-align=center
|June 29
|UFC 32: Showdown in the Meadowlands
|
| East Rutherford, New Jersey, USA
|12,500
|
|
|-align=center
|July 29
|Pride 15: Raging Rumble
|
| Saitama, Japan
|27,323
|
|
|-align=center
|September 24
|Pride 16: Beasts From the East
|
| Osaka, Japan
|
|
|
|-align=center
|September 28
|UFC 33: Victory in Vegas
|
| Las Vegas, Nevada, USA
|9,500
|75,000
|
|-align=center
|November 2
|UFC 34: High Voltage
|
| Las Vegas, Nevada, USA
|9,000
|65,000
|
|-align=center
|November 3
|Pride 17: Championship Chaos
|
| Tokyo, Japan
|
|
|
|-align=center
|December 23
|Pride 18: Cold Fury 2
|
| Fukuoka, Japan
|
|
|
|-align=center

Motorsport

Orienteering
 Orienteering included as an event for the first time in the World Games held 18–19 August in Akita, Japan.

Radiosport
 Fourth High Speed Telegraphy World Championship held in Constanța, Romania.

Rugby league
 January 26 at Bolton, England – 2001 World Club Challenge match is won by St. Helens 20–18 over the Brisbane Broncos at Reebok Stadium before 16,041.
 July 1 at Brisbane, Queensland – 2001 State of Origin is won by Queensland in the third and deciding match of the series against New South Wales at ANZ Stadium before 49,441.
 September 30 at Sydney, Australia – 2001 NRL season culminates in the Newcastle Knights' 30–24 win over the Parramatta Eels in the Grand Final at Stadium Australia before 90,414.
 October 13 at Manchester, England – Super League VI culminates in the Bradford Bulls' 37–6 win against the Wigan Warriors in the Grand Final at Old Trafford before 60,164.
 November 24 at Wigan, England – in the 2001 Kangaroo tour's last match, Australia defeat Great Britain 28–12 in the third and deciding test match in The Ashes series at JJB Stadium before 25,011.

Rugby union
 107th Six Nations Championship series is won by England
 Tri Nations – Australia
 Heineken Cup – Leicester Tigers 34–30 Stade Français

Skydiving
 The World FreeFall Convention was moved from Quincy, Illinois to Rantoul, Illinois.

Snooker
 World Snooker Championship – Ronnie O'Sullivan beats John Higgins 18-14
 World rankings – Mark Williams remains world number one for 2001/02

Swimming
 Ninth World LC Championships, held in Fukuoka, Japan (July 22 – July 29)
 United States wins the most medals (26), Australia the most gold medals (13)
 Fifth European SC Championships, held in Antwerp, Belgium (December 13 – 16)
 Germany wins the most medals (17), and the most gold medals (6)
 January 28 – Mark Foster regains the world record in the men's 50m freestyle (short course) at a swimming meet in Paris, France, clocking 21.13

Taekwondo
 World Championships held in Jeju, South Korea

Tennis
 Grand Slam in tennis men's results:
 Australian Open – Andre Agassi
 French Open – Gustavo Kuerten
 Wimbledon championships – Goran Ivanišević
 US Open – Lleyton Hewitt
 Grand Slam in tennis women's results:
 Australian Open – Jennifer Capriati
 French Open – Jennifer Capriati
 Wimbledon championships – Venus Williams
 U.S. Open – Venus Williams
 Davis Cup – France won 3–2 over Australia in world tennis.

Volleyball
 Men's World League: Brazil
 Men's European Championship: Yugoslavia
 Women's World Grand Prix: USA
 Women's European Championship: Russia

Water polo
 Men's World Championship: Spain
 Men's European Championship: Yugoslavia
 Women's World Championship: Italy
 Women's European Championship: Hungary

Multi-sport events
 Third East Asian Games held in Osaka, Japan
 Summer Goodwill Games held in Brisbane, Australia
 Sixth World Games held in Akita, Japan
 14th Mediterranean Games held in Tunis, Tunisia
 21st Summer Universiade held in Beijing, China
 20th Winter Universiade held in Zakopane, Poland

Awards
 Associated Press Male Athlete of the Year – Barry Bonds, Major League Baseball
 Associated Press Female Athlete of the Year – Jennifer Capriati, Tennis

References

 
Sports by year